Ernst Schmidt (1830–1900) was a German American physician, socialist politician, and classical scholar. A Forty-Eighter who participated in the failed Revolutions of 1848, Schmidt emigrated to the United States, settling in Chicago in 1857, where he established himself as a notable figure in both medicine and politics.

Biography
Schmidt was born in Ebern, Bavaria in 1830 and educated at the universities of Zurich, Heidelberg, Munich, and Würzburg, the latter from which he graduated in 1852. He attended post-graduate courses in Prague before returning to work as a physician at the hospital attached to the University of Würzburg. Following his participation in the 1848 Revolutions, he came to the United States with many of his comrades and began practicing medicine in Chicago. He was one of the organizers and served as vice-president of the German Medical Society of Chicago. He served in the Union Army at the outbreak of the American Civil War as a surgeon for roughly four months before returning to Chicago.

Schmidt was elected Coroner of Cook County in November 1862 and held this position until his resignation in January 1864. From 1867, he was on the staff of the Alexian Brothers Hospital and helped organize the first Jewish hospital in the city in 1869. He also served as a consultant to St. Joseph's Hospital and helped found the German American Dispensary in 1873. In the 1879 Chicago mayoral election, Schmidt ran unsuccessfully as the candidate for the Socialistic Labor Party, garnering 20.39% of the popular vote. In addition to his medical and political pursuits, Schmidt was an active scholar and translator of classical literature. He died on August 26, 1900, in Chicago.

References

1830 births
1900 deaths
Cook County Coroners
German-American Forty-Eighters
German emigrants to the United States
Union Army surgeons
Illinois socialists
Socialist Labor Party of America politicians from Illinois
19th-century American physicians
Physicians from Chicago